Juraj Sýkora (born 19 September 1983) is a Slovak professional ice hockey player who played with HC Slovan Bratislava in the Slovak Extraliga.

References

Living people
HC Slovan Bratislava players
1983 births
Ice hockey people from Bratislava
Orli Znojmo players
HC Vítkovice players
HC Košice players
Slovak expatriate ice hockey players in the Czech Republic
Rouyn-Noranda Huskies players
Slovak expatriate ice hockey players in Canada
Expatriate ice hockey players in Kazakhstan
Slovak expatriate sportspeople in Kazakhstan
Slovak ice hockey centres
HK Trnava players
HK 36 Skalica players
HC Astana players